SS Corinthic may refer to:
, an  built for White Star Line, sold in 1929 to Shaw, Savill & Albion Line and scrapped in 1931.
, a cargo steamship that successively bore the names Thurland Castle, Hemisphere, Kohki Maru and finally Nanshin Maru.

Ship names